Adrian Gore is a South African businessman and entrepreneur. He is the founder and group chief executive of Discovery Limited.

Biography

Gore launched Discovery Limited, a medical insurer, in South Africa in 1992. In 1992, Gore raised seed money for Discovery from Laurie Dippenaar, and other funders who founded Rand Merchant Bank. Discovery has since evolved into a diversified and multinational financial services group.

Prior to Discovery limited, Adrian Gore worked at Liberty Life, an insurance and investment firm.

Adrian's hobbies are running, cycling, reading.

Recognition

Gore graduated from Wits University in 1986. He is a fellow of the Actuarial Society of South Africa, a fellow of the Faculty of Actuaries (Edinburgh), an associate of the Society of Actuaries (Chicago), and a member of the American Academy of Actuaries.

In 1998, Gore was recognised as South Africa's best entrepreneur by Ernst & Young, and in 2004 was chosen as South Africa's leading CEO in the annual MoneyWeb CEO of the Year Awards. In 2008 he received the Investec award for considerable contribution in a career or profession, and in 2010, was named as the Sunday Times  business leader of the year. In 2013 Gore received the Manex Award from the University of the Witwatersrand Business School. In 2015, he was included in the Forbes list of "Africa's 50 Richest".  In 2015 Adrian was the recipient of the McKinsey Geneva Forum of Health Award. Also, he included in "All Africa Businessman of the Year 2016". In August 2017, Adrian won the Frost & Sullivan Visionary Innovation Leadership Award for Africa.

Gore chairs the South African chapter of Endeavor – a global non-profit organisation that identifies and assists high-growth entrepreneurs.

See also

References

External links
Adrian Gore at the World Economic Forum, Davos
Discovery cited for false advertising
Adrian Gore Biography
Adrian Gore Interview
Who's Who South Africa

1964 births
Living people
South African businesspeople
South African Jews
University of the Witwatersrand alumni